Zürich Selnau, ( or Bahnhof Selnau), is an underground railway station on the Zürich S-Bahn system in Selnau in the centre of the Swiss city of Zürich. The station is on a section of tunnel common to the Uetliberg line and the Sihltal line, both of which are operated by the Sihltal Zürich Uetliberg Bahn (SZU).

The original Bahnhof Selnau was an above-ground terminal station, serving as the Zürich city terminus of both the Uetliberg and Sihltal lines. It first opened in 1875 to serve the Uetliberg line, and was reached by the Sihltal line in 1892.

In 1990, the two lines were extended to an underground terminus at Zürich Hauptbahnhof via a tunnel running under and along the River Sihl. The original Bahnhof Selnau was by-passed by this line, and a new underground intermediate station was provided adjacent to the former terminus. The original terminal was then redeveloped.

The station is served by the following passenger trains:

The underground station has two tracks, served by a central platform. The platform has access to the street at each end, with the northern access emerging through an unusual mid-river structure within the River Sihl.

Gallery

References

External links

Selnau